Matthew Wilson is a garden designer, writer, radio and television broadcaster and lecturer.  He is a regular participant on Gardener's Question Time on BBC Radio 4.

He mainly works as a landscape designer but he is also a writer being a correspondent for the Financial Times.

At The Royal Horticultural Society, Chelsea Flower Show in 2015 he designed the “Royal Bank of Canada Garden”. The garden focused on living sustainably through good and understanding the importance of conserving fresh water. The garden is divided into three main parts; a zero irrigation ‘dry garden’, central water harvesting/storage zone, and edible garden He won a Silver Gilt medal at the show.

Despite his parents owning a cut flower nursery in Kent when he was a child, his career in horticulture only started in his mid-twenties. Wilson spent ten years with the Royal Horticultural Society as Curator of Hyde Hall Garden and Head of Site and Curator of Harlow Carr Garden, subsequently he became RHS Head of Gardens Creative Design. He was Managing Director of Clifton Nurseries from 2011 to 2016.  In 2016 he established Matthew Wilson Gardens (MWG) http://matthewwilsongardens.com, a garden design and horticulture consultancy, working throughout the UK and internationally on projects ranging from courtyard gardens to large estates and corporate landscapes.

At the 2016 Chelsea Flower Show his 'Welcome to Yorkshire' garden won the prestigious People's Choice award, voted for by TV viewers and visitors to the show.

He is listed in House & Garden (magazine) in 2021, as one of the top 50 garden designers in the UK.

References

English garden writers
Living people
Year of birth missing (living people)